Thomas Ram  was an Anglican priest in the early seventeenth century.

He was the son of Thomas Ram, Bishop of Ferns and Leighlin from 1605 to 1634. He was educated at Trinity College, Dublin. and was Dean of Ferns from 1626 to 1629.

References

Alumni of Trinity College Dublin
17th-century Irish Anglican priests
Deans of Ferns